The Wiesbaden Codex (also Riesencodex "giant codex"),  Hs.2 of the Hessische Landesbibliothek, Wiesbaden, is a codex containing the collected works of Hildegard of Bingen. It is a giant codex, weighing 15 kg and 30 by 45 cm in size. It dates from ca. 1200, and was started at the end of her life or just after her death, at the instigation of Guibert of Gembloux, her final secretary. The only segment of her work missing from the codex are her medical writings, which may never have existed in a finished format.

The codex does contain an extensive collection of her letters. According to scholar Lieven Van Acker, Hildegard in her last days agreed to the changes made by her editors in the collection. The format was designed by her first secretary, Volmar and was edited heavily by Guibert of Gembloux; nonetheless, she apparently authorized the changes.

The Riesencodex, was almost lost after World War II. It was appropriated by the Soviet Administration in 1947. It was returned to Wiesbaden in 1948.

See also 
 Dendermonde Codex

Notes

References
 Barbara Newman. Voice of the Living Light: Hildegard of Bingen and Her World. Berkeley: University of California Press, 1998.

External links
Riesencodex digitization by Hessian State Library/RheinMain University of Applied Sciences

Hildegard of Bingen
Medieval literature
12th-century books
German manuscripts